Marcel Courthiade (2 August 1953 – 4 March 2021) was a French linguist and researcher.

Biography
Courthiade studied medicine at the University of Clermont-Ferrand, which he abandoned to study Slavic languages, particularly Serbo-Croatian and Polish. He then studied at the Institut national des langues et civilisations orientales (INALCO) in Paris, where he earned a diploma in Polish, Macedonian, and Albanian. He titled his doctoral thesis Phonologie des variétés dialectales de Rromani et diasystèmes graphiques de la langue Rromani, a degree he earned from the École pratique des hautes études.

During his studies, Courthiade worked for several NGOs regarding education for Romani people in Albania. Subsequently, he worked as a political analyst and interpreter at the French Embassy in Albania for four years. In 1997, he became a lecturer at INALCO. In 2008, he was a key participant of Louis Mochet's film Rromani Soul. In 2019, he became a member of the scientific council .

Marcel Courthiade died in Tirana on 4 March 2021 at the age of 67.

Publications
Romani fonetika thaj Lekhipa (1986)
Xàca dùme, but godi (1980s)
Gramatika e gjuhës Rrome (1989)
Stuart Manns Wörterbuch des albanischen Romanes (1990)
In the margin of Romani. Gypsy languages in contact (1991)
Dialektologikano pućhipnasqo lil vaś-i klasifikàcia e rromane ćhibǎqe [dia]lektenqiri (1992)
Śirpustik. amare ćhibǎqiri (1992)
Lil e Efesianěnqe. Epistoli pros Efesioys (1993)
Terre d'asile, terre d'exil. l'Europe tsigane (1993)
De l'usage de l'abécédaire « Śirpustik amare ćhibǎqiri » (1994)
Langues de Diaspora (1994)
Phonologie des parlers rrom et diasysteme graphique de la langue rromani (1995)
Structure dialectale de la langue rromani (1998)
Les Rroms, Ashkalis et Gorans de Dardanie (Kosovo) (2000)
Les Tziganes ou le destin sauvage des Roms de l'Est (2002)
Appendix Two. Kannauʒ on the Ganges, cradle of the Rromani people (2004)
Les Rroms dans les belles lettres européennes (2004)
La Langue rromani, d'un millénaire à l'autre, Études Tsiganes (2005)
Sagesse et humour du peuple rrom (2007)
L'origine des Rroms. Cheminement d'une (re)découverte : Kannauj « berceau » du peuple rrom» (2007)
La littérature des Rroms, Sintés et Kalés

References

1953 births
2021 deaths
French Romani people
University of Clermont-Ferrand alumni
People from Montceau-les-Mines
Romani activists